Clay Township is an inactive township in Holt County, in the U.S. state of Missouri.

Clay Township has the name of Henry Clay of Kentucky.

References

Townships in Missouri
Townships in Holt County, Missouri